Marie Dessart (born 13 December 1980) is a Belgian former professional racing cyclist, who rode professionally for UCI Women's Team  during the 2019 women's road cycling season.

References

External links

1980 births
Living people
Belgian female cyclists
Place of birth missing (living people)